Arthur Nichols (3 September 1881 – 19 November 1937) was an Australian cricketer. He played two first-class matches for New South Wales in 1908/09.

See also
 List of New South Wales representative cricketers

References

External links
 

1881 births
1937 deaths
Australian cricketers
New South Wales cricketers
Cricketers from Sydney